Peter Leitl (born 11 June 1948) is an Austrian football manager and former player.

External links
 

1948 births
Living people
Austrian footballers
Austrian football managers
Association football defenders
First Vienna FC managers
SV Horn managers